Histocidaris elegans is a species of sea urchin in the family Histocidaridae.

References 

 Mortensen, T. (1928b). A Monograph of the Echinoidea. I. Cidaroidea, 551 pp., C. A. Reitzel & Oxford University Press, Copenhagen & London, pages 72–77

External links 
 Histocidaris elegans at the World Register of Marine Species (WoRMS)

Histocidaridae
Taxa described in 1879